Laplje Selo is a village in the Gračanica municipality of Kosovo. Laplje Selo was part of the Pristina municipality before the Gračanica municipality was created.

It is a Serb enclave situated south of Čaglavica, and has a supermajority of ethnic Serbs. During the Kosovo War, Serbs were displaced, after more than a decade, sixteen families returned to their village, on February 6, 2010. That number has since increased to just over 20 families.

Various problems, some of them related to anti-Serb sentiment, persist for returnees. There is no running water, and harassment takes place, such as cemetery desecration.

Demography

Notes

References 

Villages in Gračanica, Kosovo
Serbian enclaves in Kosovo